Princess Charlotte was a ship launched in Sunderland in 1813. She immediately started trading with the Indian Ocean and India under a license from the British East India Company (EIC). She made one voyage for the EIC, and she made two voyages transporting convicts to Australia, one to Hobart Town, Van Diemen's Land, and one to Port Jackson, New South Wales. She foundered in 1828 in the Bay of Bengal.

Career
In 1813 the EIC had lost its monopoly on the trade between India and Britain. British ships were then free to sail to India or the Indian Ocean under a license from the EIC.

EIC voyage (1819–1820): Captain William Vaughn sailed from the Downs on 12 July 1819, bound for Bengal. Princess Charlotte was at São Tiago on 22 August and arrived at Calcutta on 18 November. Homeward bound, she was at Culpee on 20 March 1820 and the Cape on 8 June. She reached Saint Helena on 25 June, and arrived back at the Downs on 14 August.<ref name=BL>[http://searcharchives.bl.uk/IAMS_VU2:IAMS045-001115578 British Library: Princess Charlotte.]</ref>

Convict voyage (1824): On 15 July 1824 Captain Joseph Blyth sailed from London, bound for Hobart Town. Princess Charlotte stopped at Falmouth on 16 July and Rio de Janeiro on 7 September,. and arrived at Hobart Town on 8 November. She had embarked 140 male convicts, none of whom died on the voyage. Thirty-nine officers and men from the 40th Regiment of Foot provided the guard.

Convict voyage (1827): Princess Charlotte, Captain Daniel Stephenson, departed Woolwich on 31 March 1827 and anchored in the Downs on 3 April. Many of the women became sea sick on the way to the Downs. Princess Charlotte arrived in Port Jackson on 6 August. She had embarked 80 female convicts, one of whom died on the journey.

FatePrincess Charlotte'', Stephenson, master, foundered on 23 September 1828 in the Bay of Bengal as she was sailing from Calcutta to Mauritius and London. Her crew was saved.

Citations and references
Citations

References
 

1813 ships
Ships built on the River Wear
Age of Sail merchant ships of England
Ships of the British East India Company
Convict ships to Tasmania
Convict ships to New South Wales
Maritime incidents in September 1828